In human sexuality, a threesome is commonly understood as "a sexual interaction between three people whereby at least one engages in physical sexual behaviour with both the other individuals". Though threesome most commonly refers to sexual activity involving three participants, it is also sometimes used to apply to a long-term domestic relationship, such as polyamory or a ménage à trois.

A threesome is a form of group sex which may occur in private situations, such as spontaneous sexual activity among three friends or in the context of casual sex or a hook up. Alternatively, it may take place in specific contexts or environments which allow for sex, such as swingers events, orgies or sex parties.

Threesomes are a common element of sexual fantasy, and are commonly depicted in pornography.

Types 
The people in a threesome may be of any gender and sexual orientation. Each participant may engage in any type of sex act with one or both of the others, such as vaginal, anal or oral sex or mutual masturbation. One or more of the participants may engage in autoerotic sexual activity, such as masturbation, possibly without physical contact with the other participants. It is a matter of subjective definition whether participation of a third person without physical contact constitutes a threesome and this sort of sexual activity might instead be interpreted as voyeurism or cuckolding. Triolism is a term that encompasses both threesomes and cuckoldry, although its usage across literature is inconsistent.

Threesomes are sometimes described using shorthand to refer to who was involved in the threesome e.g. MMF (male, male, female); FFM (female, female, male); MMM (male, male, male); FFF (female, female, female).

Lucky Pierre is slang for a person performing both receptive and insertive anal and/or vaginal sex simultaneously during a threesome, being positioned between the two partners.

Academic research on threesomes 
The first major academic work to address threesomes specifically was published in 1988, called: Threesomes: Studies in Sex, Power, and Intimacy by Arno Karlen. In the work, drawing mainly from interview data, Karlen outlined how threesomes were often viewed as qualitatively different to other forms of group sex. Other notable findings include that threesomes were often viewed by women as a safe way to explore their sexuality; they often consisted of a couple joined by a third person; and that the third person was not necessarily viewed or treated equally. Karlen also suggested that the societal view of threesomes cast those who engaged in them as radically different to other members of society:There is a common tendency to think of people who have been in threesomes as alien beings. Like swingers, homosexuals and others who deviate from basic sexual norms, they seem to many to have entered another social, psychological, and moral sphere.Research exploring rates of threesome engagement suggest that men have both higher levels of interest and participation in threesomes. One study soliciting responses to a sex survey via a British newspaper found that 34% of 1,862 men, and 15% of 2,905 women had experience of a threesome. From a nationally representative sample in the USA, 34.1% of men and 11.1% of women found a threesome to be at least somewhat appealing and 18% of men and 10% of women had engaged in one.

Sex positions 
Threesome sexual activity may take place in a number of sex positions; for example, the following:

Media
Threesome scenes are featured in various films and TV series, including Summer Lovers (1982), Threesome (1994), American Psycho (2000), Zoolander (2001), Y Tu Mamá También (2001), Ken Park (2002), The Dreamers (2003), Kiss Me Again (2006), Shortbus (2006), Vicky Cristina Barcelona (2008), Shame (2011), 21 Jump Street (2012), On the Road (2012), Savages (2012), Spring Breakers (2012), Knock Knock (2015), Love'' (2015).

See also
Adultery
Bigamy
Bisexuality
Compersion 
Open marriage
Orgy
Polygamy

References

External links 

3 (number)
Group sex
Casual sex
Sex positions
Pornography terminology